"Fortuneteller" is a song written by Dyer Hurdon and Basil Hurdon, and recorded by Bobby Curtola in 1962. The song spent 14 weeks on the Billboard Hot 100 chart, peaking at number 41 on June 23, 1962.

References

1962 songs
1962 singles